
Gmina Stanin is a rural gmina (administrative district) in Łuków County, Lublin Voivodeship, in eastern Poland.

Villages
Gmina Stanin contains the villages and settlements of Aleksandrów, Anonin, Borowina, Celiny Szlacheckie, Celiny Włościańskie, Gózd, Jarczówek, Jeleniec, Jonnik, Józefów, Kierzków, Kij, Kopina, Kosuty, Lipniak, Niedźwiadka, Nowa Wróblina, Nowy Stanin, Ogniwo, Piaski, Próchnica, Sarnów, Stajki, Stanin, Stara Gąska, Stara Wróblina, Tuchowicz, Wesołówka, Wnętrzne, Wólka Zastawska, Zagoździe, Zastawie and Zawodzie.

Neighbouring gminas
Gmina Stanin is bordered by the gminas of Krzywda, Łuków, Stoczek Łukowski, Wojcieszków and Wola Mysłowska.

References
 Polish official population figures 2006

Stanin
Łuków County